

References
  (Threonine)
  (D-Threonine)
  (L-Threonine)

Chemical data pages
Chemical data pages cleanup